Jokehnen  is a German television series, based on a novel by Arno Surminski.

See also
List of German television series

External links
 

World War II television drama series
Television series set in the 1930s
Television series set in the 1940s
1987 German television series debuts
1987 German television series endings
1980s German television miniseries
German-language television shows
Television shows based on German novels
ZDF original programming